West Limerick 102 is a community radio station broadcasting to the western parts of County Limerick in Ireland. The station operates on a non-commercial basis and has a five year licence issued by the Broadcasting Commission of Ireland. The station went on air in May, 2005 and was officially opened by then Taoiseach Bertie Ahern in April 2006.

The station has studios in Newcastle West, Abbeyfeale and Rathkeale.

The schedule features a mixture of programmes covering local news and current affairs, as well as music shows appealing to diverse musical tastes, including country, rock and Irish traditional music.

West Limerick 102 is a member of CRAOL, the Community Radio Forum of Ireland.

Broadcasting hours
 07:00 - 01:00 Daily

Broadcasting frequencies
 102.2 MHz covering the Newcastle West / Rathkeale area
 101.6 MHz covering the Shannon Estuary area
 101.4 MHz covering the Abbeyfeale area
 And online at http://www.westlimerick102.ie

History and background
West Limerick 102 is the first ever radio licence issued specifically for West Limerick.

The level of interest in having a dedicated station for the region had been tested in 2003/'04 by an unlicensed radio operation called NCW 103 (later known as NCW 106 following a move in frequency). In sharp contrast to many pirate radio operations that had previously operated in the Limerick region, the primary focus of NCW was to measure the feasibility of such a station and, having determined that the interest did indeed exist, the operators of NCW voluntarily shut down the operation and applied to the Broadcasting Commission of Ireland (BCI) for a licence to serve the area.

The initial offering from the BCI was a 30-day temporary licence, and following a significant expansion of the team of volunteers and presenters, the station went on air as "West Limerick Community Radio" for the month of June 2004. Broadcasting solely on 102.2FM, the initial pilot covered a range of about 5 miles from studios in the square in Newcastle West.

Following the relative success of the pilot, an application was made to the BCI for a full-time operation, which was subsequently granted, allowing the current station to arrive on-air in May 2005, with an expanded coverage which reaches Limerick City and South Clare, as well as additional dedicated studio facilities in Abbeyfeale and Rathkeale.

References

External links
 West Limerick 102 web site

Community radio stations in Ireland
Mass media in County Limerick
Radio stations established in 2005